Road cycling is the most widespread form of cycling in which cyclists ride on paved roadways. It includes recreational, racing, commuting, and utility cycling. As users of the road, road cyclists are generally expected to obey the same laws as motorists, however there are certain exceptions. While there are many types of bicycles that are used on the roads such as BMX, recumbents, racing, touring and utility bicycles, dedicated road bicycles have specific characteristics that make them ideal for the sport. Road bicycles have thinner tires, lighter frames with no suspension, and a set of drop handle bars to allow riders to get in a more aerodynamic position while cycling at higher speeds. At higher speeds, wind resistance becomes an important factor; aerodynamic road bikes have been developed over the years to ensure that as much as possible of the rider's energy is spent propelling the bike forward.

History
In 1817, Karl von Drais created the first bicycle which used heavy steel and wood, but since then, the road bicycle industry has adopted aluminum, carbon fiber, and titanium as the main materials for production. The first steel bicycles weighed as much as 80 pounds, whereas the lightest carbon fiber road bikes now can weigh as little as thirteen pounds.

On May 31, 1868, cycling officially became a sport with the first race occurring at Saint-Cloud Park in France. While this first race was not considered a road race, road cycling races began to pop up throughout Europe in the 1870s. Road cycling as a form of recreational activity as well as a way to commute began to gain traction shortly after these first road races. Since its origins, millions of people have adopted road cycling for either recreation or commuting.

In 2020, it was estimated that about 44.5 million people worldwide participate in road cycling, which is an increase of about five million people since 2019. Demand for road bicycles as well as other types of bicycles continued to increase throughout 2021.

Riding Safety 

Sharing the roadways with other motorists is an unavoidable aspect of road cycling, so road cyclists are generally expected to follow the same laws as their motorist counterparts. That being said, road cyclists also have the same fundamental rights as motorists. In the U.S., laws for cyclists vary by state, so it is important to keep up to date on your state's road cycling laws. You can find a breakdown of all cycling laws by state here.

Helmets 

While laws on wearing helmets vary by juristiction in the United States, Australia and New Zealand, helmets significantly reduce the risk of serious injury and death in the event of an accident.

Crash Prevention 
In 2019, 846 cyclists were killed in road related accidents in the United States. Most fatal bike crashes were caused between 6 P.M. and 9 P.M. and about 78% of fatal crashes in 2019 were in urban areas.

Some tips for crash prevention are: 

 Check to make sure that your brakes work.
 Wear reflective gear as much as possible.
 If you have shoe laces, make sure they are tied so they do not get caught in the drivetrain.
 Plan your route with caution.
 Use bike lanes as much as possible.
 Invest in a rear tail light.

Road Cycling Industry 
Some of the major companies within the road cycling industry are: 

 Accell Group
 Atlas Cycles (Haryana) Ltd.
 Avon Cycles Ltd.
 Cervelo
 Dorel Sports
 Giant Bicycles
 Merida Industry Co., Ltd
 Pinarello
 Shimano
 SRAM
 Specialized Bicycle Components, Inc.
 SCOTT Sports SA
 Trek Bicycle Corporation

See also

 Bicycle safety
 Bicycle messenger
 Cycle rickshaw
 Cycling infrastructure
 Outline of cycling

References

Cycling

Street culture